Patrick Cronin (born April 11, 1941) is an American stage, television, and film actor best known for his television appearances spanning five decades.

Biography
Cronin is a son of Ann McGlynn and Patrick Cronin Sr. After graduating from La Salle College High School, Cronin attended La Salle University where he received a bachelor's degree. He went on to earn a master's degree in theater from Temple University.

As of at least 2005 and through 2019, he is a professor of theater at East Tennessee State University in Johnson City, Tennessee. He is the former holder of The Basler Chair and the first holder of the Permanent Artist in Residence position at East Tennessee State University.

Family
Cronin married actress Beatrice Colen, granddaughter of playwright George S. Kaufman, on October 23, 1977. It lasted until her death on November 18, 1999. She succumbed to lung cancer at Cedars-Sinai Medical Center. The couple had two sons, James and Charles. 
Cronin has been married to his present wife, Dr. Amber Kinser, since 2004.

Filmography

References

External links
 
Official website. Archived from the original on April 12, 2017/

Living people
American male film actors
American male television actors
La Salle University alumni
Temple University alumni
East Tennessee State University faculty
1941 births
20th-century American male actors
21st-century American male actors
Male actors from Philadelphia